Rise Up is the 44th studio album by British pop singer Cliff Richard, released on 23 November 2018 by Vox Rock and Warner Music.  
 
It is promoted as Richard's first album of new material in 14 years following 2004's Something's Goin' On, as most albums since then were compilations, covers projects, or a combination of the two (with the possible exception of his 2011 album Soulicious, which contained primarily new material with 11 original songs out of 15).

The album follows Richard's legal battle with the BBC, and he has said of the album's title, "I chose 'Rise Up' as the title track because after the bad period I went through in my life, I've managed to rise up out of what seemed like a quagmire". Richard also said he hopes the album will attract a new audience: "I could be recognised by some of these younger people to be a valuable artist. I'm not messing around with it, it's for real". The album reached number four on the UK Albums Chart and was certified Gold.

Three singles have been released from the album. The title track, written by Terry Britten (who wrote Richard's hits "Devil Woman" and "Carrie") was released as the first lead single. "Reborn" was the second lead single. It was co-written by Chris Eaton, who wrote Richard's 1990 Christmas number 1, "Saviours Day". The third single was the double A-side "Everything That I Am" / "The Miracle of Love".  
 
The album also includes Richard performing a duet with Olivia Newton-John on the track "Everybody's Someone", originally recorded by LeAnn Rimes and Brian McFadden.

Track listing
All tracks produced by Rupert Christie; additional production by Jochem van der Saag and Jorge Vivo. Except "The Minute You're Gone", "Miss You Nights", "Devil Woman" and "Some People" produced by James Morgan and Juliette Pochin and feature The Royal Philharmonic Orchestra.

Charts and certifications

Weekly charts

Year-end charts

Certifications

References

2018 albums
Cliff Richard albums